The men's 500 metres races of the 2014–15 ISU Speed Skating World Cup 1, arranged in the Meiji Hokkaido-Tokachi Oval, in Obihiro, Japan, were held on the weekend of 14–16 November 2014.

Race one was won by Jan Smeekens of the Netherlands, while Pavel Kulizhnikov of Russia came second, and Ruslan Murashov of Russia came third. Aleksey Yesin of Russia won Division B of race one, and was thus, under the rules, automatically promoted to Division A for race two.

In race two, Kulizhnikov ended ahead of Smeekens, with Ryohei Haga of Japan in third place. Artyom Kuznetsov of Russia won Division B of race two.

Race 1
Race one took place on Friday, 14 November, with Division B scheduled in the morning session, at 12:13, and Division A scheduled in the afternoon session, at 16:47.

Division A

Division B

Race 2
Race two took place on Sunday, 16 November, with Division B scheduled in the morning session, at 12:49, and Division A scheduled in the afternoon session, at 16:40.

Division A

Division B

References

Men 0500
1